Harry Peter Stuart McInley (10 August 1993) is an English former first-class cricketer.

McInley was born at Redhill in August 1993. He was educated at Caterham School, before going up to Hatfield College, Durham. While studying at Durham, he played two first-class cricket matches for Durham MCCU against Somerset and Durham in 2015. He scored 12 runs in his two matches, in addition to taking a single wicket with his right-arm medium pace bowling.

References

External links

1993 births
Living people
People from Redhill, Surrey
People educated at Caterham School
Alumni of Hatfield College, Durham
English cricketers
Durham MCCU cricketers